Abbotts Creek Township may refer to:

Abbotts Creek Township, Davidson County, North Carolina, a county in Davidson County, North Carolina
Abbotts Creek Township, Forsyth County, North Carolina

See also
Abbotts Creek, North Carolina

North Carolina township disambiguation pages